Lou Reid Pyrtle (born September 13, 1954 in Union Grove, North Carolina) is an American bluegrass singer, band leader, and multi-instrumentalist.

Biography

Early life
Reid grew up on a tobacco farm in Moore Springs, North Carolina. His father also worked as a construction supervisor. When Reid was a young boy his father took him to see Flatt & Scruggs, and Reid has loved bluegrass music ever since.

In his early teens, Reid played acoustic bass with the band Bluegrass Buddies, then joined the bluegrass group Southbound, who recorded one album for Rebel Records. He played banjo with them from 1973 to 1979. Other members included Jimmy Haley (guitar), Dennis Severt (mandolin), and Doug Campbell (bass).

Doyle Lawson and Quicksilver
In 1979, Lou joined Doyle Lawson and Quicksilver, playing bass guitar. Quicksilver consisted of Lawson (mandolin), Reid (bass), Terry Baucom (banjo), and Jimmy Haley (guitar). Reid recorded three albums with Quicksilver.

Ricky Skaggs Band
Reid was with the Ricky Skaggs Band from 1982 to 1986, playing a number of instruments and providing harmony vocals.

Seldom Scene
Reid replaced Phil Rosenthal as lead singer and guitarist for the Seldom Scene in 1986. Reid was a member of the Seldom Scene for six years, then left in 1993 for Nashville to tour with Vince Gill and Vern Gosdin.

When John Duffey died in 1996, Ben Eldridge brought Reid back to the Seldom Scene, while also continuing to perform and record with his band Carolina.

Longview
Reid joined the reunited bluegrass supergroup Longview in 2008 to record Deep in the Mountains. Other members included J. D. Crowe (banjo), Don Rigsby (mandolin), James King (vocals), Marshall Wilborn (bass), and Ron Stewart (fiddle).

Lou Reid and Carolina
In 1992, Lou Reid formed his band Carolina in with lifelong friend Terry Baucom and Marcus Smith (bass).

Carolina's first album Carolina Blue was followed in 1995 by Carolina Moon. Then Baucom left the band to pursue his own career.

In 1996, Carolina released a third album Lou Reid & Carolina and in 2010 released Blue Heartache.

Christy Reid joined Carolina in 2002.  She first joined as guitar player, and moved to bass in 2005.

It would be five years and a line-up change before Reid and Carolina's next release, Time, in 2005. Reid was joined this time by vocalist Christy Reid, guitarist Kevin Richardson, banjoist Trevor Watson, and bassist Joe Hannabach. Released on Lonesome Day Records, the album also featured a number of high-profile guest appearances, including Vince Gill, Ricky Skaggs, and Jerry Douglas.

Awards
In 1994, Lou Reid and Carolina received the International Bluegrass Music Association (IBMA) Emerging Artist of the Year award. In 1995, the album Carolina Moon was nominated for Album of the Year by the IBMA.

Personal life
Reid met his wife Christy in 2001 when she auditioned for Carolina as a bass player. She got the job, and three years later they were married. They have two daughters.

Discography

Solo albums
 1993: When It Rains (Sugar Hill)

Collaborations
 1989: High Time (Sugar Hill) with Mike Auldridge and T. Michael Coleman

As a member of Southbound
 1977: Southbound (Rebel)

As a member of Doyle Lawson and Quicksilver
 1979: Doyle Lawson & Quicksilver (Sugar Hill)
 1981: Rock My Soul (Sugar Hill)
 1982: Quicksilver Rides Again (Sugar Hill)

As a member of the Ricky Skaggs Band
 1983: Don't Cheat in Our Hometown – (Sugar Hill)
 1984: Country Boy (Epic Nashville)
 1985: Live in London (Epic Nashville)

As a member of The Seldom Scene
 1988: 15th Anniversary Celebration (Sugar Hill)
 1988: A Change of Scenery (Sugar Hill)
 1990: Scenic Roots (Sugar Hill)
 1991: Scene 20: 20th Anniversary Concert (Sugar Hill)
 2000: Scene It All (Sugar Hill)
 2007: Scenechronized (Sugar Hill)
 2014: Long Time... Seldom Scene (Smithsonian Folkways)

As a member of Longview
 2008: Deep in the Mountains (Rounder)

As a member of Lou Reid and Carolina
 1993: Carolina Blue (Webco)
 1994: Carolina Moon (Rebel)
 1996: Lou Reid & Carolina (Rebel)
 2000: Blue Heartache (Rebel)
 2003: Carolina, I'm Coming Home (LRC)
 2005: Time (Lonesome Day)
 2009: My Own Set of Rules (Rural Rhythm)
 2010: Sounds Like Heaven to Me (Rural Rhythm)
 2012: Calling Me Back Home (KMA)
 2016: 20th Anniversary: Live at the Down Home (KMA)
 2016: Rollin' On (self-released)

Also appears on
 1984: Vern Gosdin – If Jesus Comes Tomorrow (What Then) (Compleat)
 1987: Paul Adkins – Appalachian Memories (Old Homestead)
 1988: Virginia Squires – Variations (Rebel)
 1989: Mike Auldridge – Treasures Untold (Sugar Hill)
 1989: The Smith Sisters – Roadrunner (Flying Fish)
 1990: Mike Auldridge – High Time (Sugar Hill)
 1999: Scottie Sparks – Scottie Sparks (Doobie Shea)
 2000: Ron Spears – My Time Has Come (Copper Creek)
 2004: Darin Aldridge – Call It a Day (Pinecastle)
 2007: Dwight McCall – Never Say Never Again (Rural Rhythm)
 2011: Audie Blaylock and Redline - I'm Going Back to Old Kentucky: A Bill Monroe Celebration (Rural Rhythm)

References

External links 
 
 
 
 

1954 births
Living people
20th-century American singers
21st-century American singers
American bluegrass mandolinists
American country guitarists
American country singer-songwriters
American male guitarists
American male singer-songwriters
American mandolinists
American multi-instrumentalists
20th-century American guitarists
20th-century American male singers
21st-century American male singers
Longview (American band) members
People from Union Grove, North Carolina